TR3A may refer to:

 Triumph TR3A, automobile from the United Kingdom
 TR-3A Black Manta, speculated USAF spyplane